Asuncion (from Spanish meaning "ascension" in reference to the Spanish explorers belief in the "Asuncion" of the Holy Virgin Mary) is the third northernmost island in the Northern Mariana Islands chain in the Pacific Ocean. The island is uninhabited.

History 
From a European perspective Asuncion was discovered in 1669 by the Spanish missionary Diego Luis de San Vitores who gave it its present name (Assumption of Mary in Spanish). It is likely that it was previously visited in 1522 by the Spanish sailor Gonzalo de Vigo, deserter from the Magellan expedition in 1521, and also the first European castaway in the history of the Pacific. In 1695, the native Chamorros were forcibly removed to Saipan, and three years later to Guam.

Asuncion was ceded by Spain to Germany through the German–Spanish Treaty (1899), toghether with the rest of the Mariana Islands (except Guam). The formalities of cession were carried on November 17, 1899, in Saipan, for all the Northern Mariana Islands.

Following the sale of the Northern Marianas by Spain to the German Empire in 1899, Asuncion was administered as part of German New Guinea. In 1903, the island was leased to a Japanese company, who hunted birds for feathers for export to Japan, and from there to Paris. Six Japanese hunters died on the island in 1910 from illness.

During World War I, Asuncion came under the control of the Empire of Japan and was subsequently administered as the South Seas Mandate. Following World War II, the island came under the control of the United States and was administered as part of the Trust Territory of the Pacific Islands. Since 1978, the island has been part of the Northern Islands Municipality of the Commonwealth of the Northern Mariana Islands.

In 1985, per the Constitution of the Commonwealth of the Northern Mariana Islands, the island was designated as a wilderness area for the protection and conservation of natural resources. Since 2009, the island has been part of Marianas Trench Marine National Monument of the United States.

Geography

The volcano is asymmetrical, with steep northeast slopes terminating in high cliffs. The southwestern slopes are shallower and meet the sea in low cliffs. Coastlines are generally rocky.
Vegetation includes Swordgrass (Miscanthus floridulus) grasslands on the upper slopes, forests of Coconut Palm (Cocos nucifera), with some  Pandanus  trees and Papaya (Carica papaya) on the lower slopes, along with native Pisonia.

Important Bird Area
The island has been recognized as an Important Bird Area (IBA) by BirdLife International because it supports populations of Micronesian megapodes, white-throated ground doves, Micronesian myzomelas and Micronesian starlings.

See also
 List of stratovolcanoes

References

External links 

 
 UN earthwatch info on island
 Pascal Horst Lehne and Christoph Gäbler: Über die Marianen. Lehne-Verlag, Wohldorf in Germany 1972.
 

Former German colonies
Uninhabited islands of the Northern Mariana Islands
Stratovolcanoes of the United States
Volcanoes of the Northern Mariana Islands
Agrihan
Active volcanoes
Important Bird Areas of the Northern Mariana Islands
Holocene stratovolcanoes